The 1878 Cincinnati Reds season was a season in American baseball. The team finished second in the National League with a record of 37–23, four games behind the Boston Red Caps.

Regular season
After finishing their first two seasons in the National League in last place, the Reds were hoping for some improvement in the 1878 season. Cincinnati signed Cal McVey of the Chicago White Stockings to become the team's new third baseman, and new manager. Catcher Deacon White of the Boston Red Caps signed with Cincinnati. White led the National League with a .387 batting average, 103 hits, eleven triples, 49 RBI, and a .545 slugging percentage with the Red Caps in 1877. White also led the National League with 60 RBI while playing for the White Stockings in 1876. On the mound, 23-year-old Will White was signed by the Reds. White appeared in three games with the Boston Red Caps in 1877, going 2–1 with a 3.00 ERA.

Charley Jones had another very solid season with the Reds, as he had a .310 batting average, along with a team high three home runs and 39 RBI. White saw his production slip, however, he still hit .314 with 29 RBI. Player-manager McVey was solid with a .306 average and two home runs along with 28 RBI.  Rookie King Kelly hit .283 with 27 RBI. White had a spectacular season, going 30–21 with a 1.79 ERA in 468 innings pitched.

Season summary 
The Reds opened the season with a six-game winning streak, and stayed hot in their first twenty games, going 15–5, and were sitting in first place in the National League. Cincinnati then went on a six-game losing streak, falling to 15–11, and out of first place. The Reds never reclaimed first place; however, they finished the season strong, including a nine-game winning streak late in the year, to finish in second place with a 37–23 record, five games behind the first place Boston Red Caps.

Season standings

Record vs. opponents

Roster

Player stats

Batting

Starters by position
Note: Pos = Position; G = Games played; AB = At bats; H = Hits; Avg. = Batting average; HR = Home runs; RBI = Runs batted in

Other batters
Note: G = Games played; AB = At bats; H = Hits; Avg. = Batting average; HR = Home runs; RBI = Runs batted in

Pitching

Starting pitchers
Note: G = Games pitched; IP = Innings pitched; W = Wins; L = Losses; ERA = Earned run average; SO = Strikeouts

External links
1878 Cincinnati Reds season at Baseball Reference

Cincinnati Reds (1876–1880) seasons
Cincinnati Reds season
Cincinnati